Anren County is a county in Hunan Province, China, it is under the administration of Chenzhou prefecture-level City.

Located on the southeast of the province, it is the northernmost county-level division of Chenzhou City. The county is bordered to the north by Hengdong and You Counties, to the east by Chaling and Yanling Counties, to the south and southwest by Yongxing County, to the west by Leiyang City and Hengnan County. The county has five towns and eight townships under its jurisdiction, the county seat is Yonglejiang.

Administrative divisions
5 towns
 Yonglejiang
 Longhai
 Lingguan
 Ping'an
 Jinzixian

8 townships
 Longshi
 Chengping
 Dukou
 Zhushan
 Yangji
 Huawang
 Pailou
 Pingbei

Climate

References

www.xzqh.org

External links
Anren Government's official website

 
County-level divisions of Hunan
Geography of Chenzhou